Transmission of an infection requires three conditions:
an infectious individual
a susceptible individual
an effective contact between them

An effective contact is defined as any kind of contact between two individuals such that, if one individual is infectious and the other susceptible, then the first individual infects the second. Whether or not a particular kind of contact will be effective depends on the infectious agent and its route of transmission.

The effective contact rate (denoted β) in a given population for a given infectious disease is measured in effective contacts per unit time. This may be expressed as the total contact rate (the total number of contacts, effective or not, per unit time, denoted ), multiplied by the risk of infection, given contact between an infectious and a susceptible individual. This risk is called the transmission risk and is denoted p. Thus:

The total contact rate, will generally be greater than the effective contact rate, β, since not all contacts result in infection. That is to say, p can never be greater than 1, since it is effectively the probability of transmission occurring.

This relation formalises the fact that the effective contact rate depends not only on the social patterns of contact in a particular society (γ) but also on the specific types of contact and the pathology of the infectious organism (p). For example, it has been shown that a concurrent sexually transmitted infection can substantially increase the probability (p) of infecting a susceptible with HIV. Therefore, one way to reduce the value of p (and hence lower HIV transmission rates) might be to treat other sexually transmitted infections.

There are a number of difficulties in using this relation. The first is that it is very difficult to measure contact rates because they vary widely between individuals and groups, and within the same group at different times. For sexually transmitted infections, large scale studies of sexual behaviour have been set up to estimate the contact rate. In developed countries for serious diseases such as AIDS or tuberculosis, contact tracing is often carried out when a patient is diagnosed (the patient and medical authorities try to inform every possible contact the patient may have made since infection). This, however, is not so much a research tool and more to alert the contacts to the possibility that they may be infected and so can seek medical treatment and avoiding passing on the disease if they have contracted it. 

A second consideration is that it is generally thought unethical to carry out direct experiments to establish per-contact infection risks as this would require the deliberate exposure of individuals to infectious agents. The Common Cold Unit that researched cold transmission in the UK between 1946 and 1989 was a notable exception. It is also possible to estimate the transmission risk in certain circumstances where exposures to infection have been documented, for example the rate of infection among nurses who have accidentally pricked their fingers with a needle that had previously been used with contaminated blood.

A more direct assessment of transmission risks can be provided by a contact study, which is often carried out because of an outbreak (such a study was carried out during the SARS outbreak of 2002–3). The first (or primary) case within a defined group (such as a school or family) is identified and people infected by this individual (called secondary cases) are documented. If the number of susceptibles in the group is n and the number of secondary cases is x, then an estimation of the transmission risk is

Here, p is the same parameter as before but it has been calculated in a different way. To reflect this, it is called the secondary attack rate (it is really a risk, of course, and not a rate, but the term is still commonly used).

Even if the whole group in question is susceptible, x is generally smaller than the basic reproduction number for the disease. That is defined as the number of individuals each infected individual will go on to infect themselves, in a population with no resistance to the disease. The basic reproduction number includes all secondary cases infected by a primary case, while x is only the number of secondary cases within the group in question.

Secondary attack rates are useful for comparisons between vaccinated and unvaccinated groups and hence assessing the efficacy of vaccinations against the disease under inspection. However, there are inevitably complications with such contact studies. It is not always obvious which members of the group are susceptible and distinguishing between secondary and subsequent cases (for example, those infected by the secondary cases are tertiary cases and so on) can be difficult. Also, the possibility of infection from an outsider must be ignored.

Despite these problems, the parameters p and β are powerful tools in the mathematical modelling of epidemics. But it should always be remembered that a model is only as good as the assumptions on which it is based and the data from which its parameters are calculated.

See also

 Basic reproduction number
 Bugchasing and giftgiving
 Epidemic model
 Mathematical modelling in epidemiology
 Risk factor
 Transmission (medicine)
 Transmission coefficient (epidemiology)

Epidemiology
Medical statistics